The Victory Services Club (VSC) is a private members club and registered charity in London, England for retired, veteran, serving members and immediate family members of Commonwealth and NATO armed forces, including the UK and US. Membership is open to all ranks of Commonwealth and NATO's armies, navies, marines and air forces, differing from other military clubs in London which restrict membership either to their officer corps, other ranks or to members of a particular corps, branch, regiment or service.

Located near Marble Arch and Connaught Square, the club provides lodging, dining services and conference facilities to members. The club also includes a trading arm for corporate events. This includes eight event spaces, which can hold from 200 to 300 guests.

History
The club was founded in 1907, providing services to retired members of the armed forces. In 1970, it broadened membership qualification to include currently serving members, and civilian family. Original premises were in Holborn, with a move soon after to other premises in the same area. In 1948, the club moved to its current larger premises in a building used by American forces during the Second World War. The accommodation was extended, with construction starting in 1954 on an adjacent site, and the Memorial Wing being opened by Prime Minister Winston Churchill in 1957.

Initially known as the Veterans' Club when opened by Major Arthur Haggard, brother of the author H. Rider Haggard, the club was renamed in 1936 in memory of Field Marshal Viscount Edmund Allenby, who had been President since 1933.

With membership still limited to retired servicemen and immediate family, the club was later renamed as the Victory Ex-Services Club, and in 1970 assumed the present name when membership was opened to serving personnel and families.

On 11 October 1974 at around 10:30 pm the club, and the Army and Navy Club, were bombed by the Provisional Irish Republican Army's London based active service unit, injuring one person.

As a charity, the club works with other service charities and the Armed Forces Welfare Agencies to provide support for wounded personnel and carers on respite opportunities in London.

Its patrons have included General Eisenhower, Field-Marshal Earl Alexander of Tunis and Field-Marshal Viscount Montgomery of Alamein. In 2014 Camilla, Duchess of Cornwall succeeded Prince Philip, Duke of Edinburgh as Patron-in-Chief. The club has approximately 65,000 members and has the largest membership of any military club in the UK.

Membership
Membership in the Victory Services Club is open to all ranks of the four British armed services and of the NATO members' forces, both active and retired, widows and widowers of British armed services, as well as Commonwealth and Native personnel, and parents and children (over 18) of serving and ex-serving personnel. Members obtain unlimited use of the club's facilities, including the accommodation, restaurant and bar, as well as discount rates for event rooms and catering.

Members can invite as many as four guests to stay in the club, store luggage and receive the VSC's twice-yearly newsletter. There are also reciprocal arrangements available with affiliated clubs in Edinburgh, New York, San Francisco, Sydney, Canada, Malaysia and New Zealand.

Accommodation
The Victory Services Club has been recognised and recommended by numerous publications, including the Los Angeles Times, as a unique travel option for travelling active duty, veteran, and retired members of NATO's military forces. The club offers more than 200 accommodation rooms including singles, twins, doubles, family rooms and disabled access rooms across two wings. Bathrooms are available en-suite or shared, and meals may be included with accommodation or bought separately. A well-stocked library, reading room, and portraits of statesmen and military leaders placed throughout the club emphasize its military origin and maintain that orderly character, while two bars and daily afternoon tea provide a comfortable setting in which to relax and meet other members visiting the club.

Further reading

References

External links

1907 establishments in the United Kingdom
British veterans' organisations
Clubs and societies in London
Military of the United Kingdom
Military gentlemen's clubs
Tyburnia